The Norwegian Petroleum Institute is a Norwegian petroleum lobbying organization formed in 1970. Its purpose is to "attend to and promote the common interest of the [petroleum] industry".

The petroleum companies Esso Norge, YX Energi Norge, Norske Shell, Statoil Norge, AGA AS, Castrol Norge, Yara Industrial, Nynas, Valvoline Oil and Progas are behind the Norwegian Petroleum Institute. It also has ties with the Confederation of Norwegian Enterprise. Its board consists of Håvard Kjærstad (ESSO), Tage Kruse (YX), Lars Inge Lunde (Shell), Dag Roger Rinde (Statoil), Sven Borger Fiedler (Castrol) and secretary Inger-Lise M. Nøstvik.

It has been criticized for manufacturing quasi-journalistic information and news, which was picked up by the Norwegian news media, and eventually had political impact.

References

Petroleum industry in Norway
Business organisations based in Norway
Organizations established in 1970
Non-renewable resource companies established in 1970